Cecilie Friberg Klysner (born 2 May 1994) is a Danish orienteering competitor. At the 2016 World Orienteering Championships in Strömstad she won a gold medal in mixed sprint relay with the Danish team, along with Tue Lassen, Søren Bobach and Maja Alm.

References

External links

1994 births
Living people
Danish orienteers
Female orienteers
Foot orienteers
World Orienteering Championships medalists
Competitors at the 2017 World Games